The rājyābhiṣeka is a late Vedic ceremony of coronation. It also refers to anointing government officials, particularly heads of state, at the time of taking power or to mark a signal achievement.

See also
Abhiṣeka
Rajasuya
Coronation of the Nepalese monarch
Coronation of the Thai monarch

References

Vedic customs
Coronation